Jimmy Ellis may refer to:
 Jimmy Ellis (boxer) (1940–2014), American boxer
 Jimmy "Orion" Ellis (1945–1998), American singer
 Jimmy "Preacher" Ellis (born 1935), American musician
 Jimmy Ellis (1937–2012), lead singer of The Trammps
 Jimmy Ellis, former American motocross racer in AMA Supercross Championship

See also
James Ellis (disambiguation)
Jim Ellis (disambiguation)